Pakistan Cadet School and College is an established military preparatory  school located in Murree, a hill station town in the vicinity of the north Punjab, Pakistan.

The cadet college offers its students a choice of streams, offering both Pakistani stream higher education (board examination certificates) as well as GCE O and A level qualifications.

References

External links
 http://www.pakistancadetcollege.com/

Cadet colleges in Pakistan
Universities and colleges in Murree
Education in Murree
Buildings and structures in Murree
Schools in Murree